The 2016 Assen Superbike World Championship round was the fourth round of the 2016 Superbike World Championship. It took place over the weekend of 15–17 April 2016 at the TT Circuit Assen.

Championship standings after the round

Superbike Championship standings after Race 1

Superbike Championship standings after Race 2

Supersport Championship standings

External links
 Superbike Race 1 results
 Superbike Race 2 results
 Supersport Race results

2016 Superbike World Championship season
Assen Superbike World Championship round
Assen Superbike World Championship round